This is a list of episodes in the American animated television series Generator Rex.

Series overview

Episodes

Season 1 (2010)

Season 2 (2011)

Season 3 (2011–13)

These episodes were released on Xbox Live, PlayStation Network, and iTunes.

Special (2021)

References

External links
 

Lists of American children's animated television series episodes
Lists of Cartoon Network television series episodes
Episodes
2010s television-related lists